Alicia Moreau de Justo (October 11, 1885 – May 12, 1986) was an Argentine physician, politician, pacifist and human rights activist. She was a leading figure in feminism and socialism in Argentina. Since the beginning of the 20th century, she got involved in public claims for opening rights for women. In 1902, joined by a fellow activists, she founded the Feminist Socialist Center of Argentina and the Feminine Work Union of Argentina.

Biography
Alicia Moreau de Justo was born October 11, 1885.

She organized conferences in the Fundación Luz [Light Foundation], and together with her father, co-founded the Ateneo Popular [the People's Athenaeum]. She was chief editor of the journal Humanidad Nueva [New Humanity], and director of the publication Nuestra Causa [Our Cause]. In 1914 she graduated from college as a medical doctor, and some years later, she joined the Socialist Party. Soon after that, she married the politician Juan B. Justo, and together they had three children.

By 1918, she had founded the Unión Feminista Nacional [National Feminist Union], and after her husband passing away in 1928, she continued her political activity defending women, specially in matters related to women's right to vote, working rights of paid staff, public health and public education. In 1932, she created a draft law to establish women's suffrage, which was not sanctioned until 1947 in Argentina. She supported the Second Spanish Republic during the Spanish Civil War and was a regular critic of Peronism, which she qualified as antidemocratic. In 1958, she took part in the division of the Socialist Party and the founding of the Argentinean Socialist Party, accepting the director position of the newspaper La Vanguardia until 1960. She continued working until her last years, and was one of the founders of the Permanent Assembly for Human Rights in 1975.

The Argentine Feminist Union 
She co-founded the National Feminist Union in Argentina, which aimed to unite different feminist organizations that existed in Argentina during that time. Some of these were: the Feminist Socialist Center, the Feminine Socialist Gathering and the National Council of Women. The political action of the NFU was key to support sanctioning of many laws recognizing women's rights and the protection of women's work, as well as to defend single mothers. This organization published the monthly magazine Nuestra Causa, to promote their ideas and organize women activists during electoral rallies, as well as massive petitions to the Legislative Power.

References

External links

Alicia Moreau de Justo Foundation (Archived 2009-10-25) (Spanish)
Profile (Spanish)
Short Biography at the Konex Foundation (Spanish)
Obituary at The New York Times

1885 births
1986 deaths
English emigrants to Argentina
Argentine centenarians
Argentine feminists
Argentine suffragists
Argentine people of French descent
Argentine women physicians
Illustrious Citizens of Buenos Aires
Socialist Party (Argentina) politicians
Socialist feminists
20th-century Argentine women politicians
20th-century Argentine politicians
Argentine pacifists
Women centenarians